The Bermuda National Grid 2000 (BNG) is a kind of Transverse Mercator projection. It is not a Universal Transverse Mercator (UTM) projection, as it has an origin and other parameters that are different from those used in UTM.

Grid Parameters:

References

Online resources:
 Convert from BNG to lat/lon in Google earth
 Eye4Software's online converter.

Map projections
Geography of Bermuda